Kamalabad (also Romanized as Kamālābād; also known as Kamālābād Beyẕā) is a village in Banesh Rural District, Beyza District, Sepidan County, Fars Province, Iran. At the 2006 census, its population was 267, in 58 families.

References 

Populated places in Beyza County